A puzzle jug is a puzzle in the form of a jug, popular in the 18th and 19th centuries.  Puzzle jugs of varying quality were popular in homes and taverns.  An inscription typically challenges the drinker to consume the contents without spilling them, which, because the neck of the jug is perforated, is impossible to do conventionally.  

The solution to the puzzle is that the jug has a hidden tube, one end of which is the spout. The tube usually runs around the rim and then down the handle, with its other opening inside the jug and near the bottom. To solve the puzzle, the drinker must suck from the spout end of the tube. To make the puzzle more interesting, it was common to provide a number of additional holes along the tube, which must be closed off before the contents could be sucked.    Some jugs even have a hidden hole to make the challenge still more confounding.

History
The earliest example in England is the Exeter puzzle jug—an example of medieval pottery in Britain. The Exeter puzzle jug dates from about AD 1300 and was originally made in Saintonge,  Western France.  The puzzle jug is a descendant of earlier drinking puzzles, such as the fuddling cup and the pot crown, each of which has a different solution.

Known inscriptions include:
 Come drink of me and merry be.
 Come drink your fill, but do not spill.
 Fill me up with licker sweet / For it is good when fun us do meet.
 Gentlemen, now try your Skill / I'll hold your Sixpence if you Will / That you don't drink unless you spill.
 Here, Gentlemen, come try your skill / I'll hold a wager if you will / That you don't drink this liquor all / Without you spill and let some fall.
Within this jug there is good liquor/ 'tis fit for Parson or for Vicar/ but how to drink and not to spill/ will test the utmost of your skill"

See also
Bridge-spouted vessel
Dribble glass
Fuddling cup
Pythagorean cup

References

External links
A puzzle jug
Martin Homer's Puzzle Jugs

Mechanical puzzles
Drinkware
Pottery shapes